Iberoneta is a monotypic genus of European dwarf spiders containing the single species, Iberoneta nasewoa. It was first described by Christa Laetitia Deeleman-Reinhold in 1984, and has only been found in Spain.

See also
 List of Linyphiidae species (I–P)

References

Linyphiidae
Monotypic Araneomorphae genera